The 1942 Daniel Field Eagles football team represented Daniel Field during the 1942 college football season.  Coached by Marion Bird, the Eagles compiled at least a 0–6 record, and of the known games were outscored by a total of 12 to 123.  Much of Daniel Field's 1942 season is not well recorded, and it is possible, or even probable that the Army Air Field team played an extended schedule as opposed to the one reported throughout the newspapers of the time.  In a special Associated Press poll for the rankings of service academy football team's for the 1942 season, Daniel Field received a single vote from the 91 sportswriters present, to result in a tie for No. 20 with Fort Douglas and Camp Shelby.

Schedule

References

 
Fort Totten
Daniel Field Eagles football